The 2005–06 season was Norwich City's first year back in the Football League Championship after being relegated from the Premier League in the previous season. This article shows statistics and lists all matches that Norwich City played in the season.

Season overview

Final league table

Matches

League

August

September

October

November

December

January

February

March

April

League Cup

FA Cup

Transfers

Summer

In

Out

Winter

In

Out

Players

First team squad
Squad at end of season.

Left club during season

Board and staff members

Board members

Coaching staff

Notes

References

Norwich City F.C. seasons
Norwich City